Fiji competed at the 2014 Commonwealth Games in Glasgow from 23 July to 3 August. This marks Fiji's return to the Commonwealth Games. The country was suspended from the Commonwealth of Nations in September 2009 following the 2006 military coup which brought Commodore Voreqe Bainimarama to power. With elections due on 17 September to restore democracy after eight years of military-led rule, Fiji's suspension was lifted in March 2014. After missing the 2010 Commonwealth Games in Delhi, the country was thus able to return in time for Glasgow however it came too late for them to enter a team in the rugby sevens tournament. The Fiji Association of Sports and National Olympic Committee confirmed a delegation of twenty-six athletes in six sports.

Medalists

Athletics

Men
Track & road events

Field Events

Women
Track & road events

Judo

Men

Lawn bowls

Men

Women

Shooting

Men

Swimming

Men

Women

Weightlifting

Men

Women

References

Nations at the 2014 Commonwealth Games
2014
Commonwealth Games